The Argentine legislative elections of 1987 were held on 6 September. Voters chose their legislators and governors, with a turnout of 83.6%. The ruling Radical Civic Union lost their majority in the Chamber of Deputies.

Background

The domestic and international esteem President Raúl Alfonsín earned for advancing the Trial of the Juntas suffered in December 1986, when on his initiative, Congress passed the Full Stop Law, which limited the civil trials against roughly 300 officers implicated in the 1976-79 Dirty War against dissidents to those indicted within 60 days of the law's passage, a tall order given the reluctance of many victims and witnesses to testify. These concessions did not placate hard-liners in the Argentine military who, though in a minority, put Argentina's hard-earned Democracy at risk in April 1987, when a group identified as Carapintadas ("painted faces," from their use of camouflage paint) loyal to Army Major Aldo Rico staged a mutiny of the important Army training base of Campo de Mayo during the Easter weekend. Negotiating in person with the rebels after four days of national suspense, Alfonsín secured their surrender, memorably announcing that "the house is in order."

The goodwill this earned Alfonsín and his centrist Radical Civic Union (UCR) began to erode when in June, Congress passed Alfonsín's Law of Due Obedience, granting immunity to officers implicated in crimes against humanity on the basis of "due obedience." This law, condemned by Amnesty International, among others, effectively halted most remaining prosecutions of Dirty War criminals.

The economy, too, became increasingly challenging. The 1985 Austral Plan had helped lead to a recovery in 1986; but frequent wage freezes ordered by the Economy Minister, Juan Sourrouille, kept real wages from rising, and GDP remained below its 1980 peak, in any case. A sharp fall in global commodity prices had evaporated the nation's US$4 billion trade surplus by 1987, and foreign debt interest payments could only be financed with more public debt, helping lead to a sudden halving of the value of the Argentine austral after May. Inflation (4% a month in May) rose to 14% in August, and though GDP grew modestly, real wages slid by around 8%.

Election night, September 6, dealt Alfonsín's UCR its sharpest blow among the nation's governors. The UCR lost 5 of its 7 governors elected in 1983, including the nation's most important: Governor Alejandro Armendáriz of the Province of Buenos Aires (home to 38% of Argentines). Armendáriz had been a key supporter of the President's Project Patagonia, which envisaged the transfer of the nation's capital from Buenos Aires to Viedma for the sake of decentralization. The project, which had been passed by the Lower House of Congress and had even received Pope John Paul II's personal blessing during an April 1987 state visit, had no future without an absolute UCR majority in the Lower House (the Senate - not in play in 1987 - was dominated by the Justicialist Party). 

The loss of 13 UCR Congressmen benefited smaller, issue-oriented parties more than it did the Justicialists (whose gains were primarily among the governors, going from 12 to 17). The first to benefit in Congress was the conservative Union of the Democratic Centre (UCeDé), which ran on a free market platform calling for privatizations of an array of State enterprises, responsible for nearly half the nation's goods and services. These companies' losses, led by the Argentine Railways', were blamed by the UCeDé's leader, Alvaro Alsogaray, for the public sector cash flow problem and resulting financial instability (while disregarding the role of foreign debt interest payments). The UCeDé's gain of 4 Congressmen in these elections, though menial, portended the policy of "surgery without anesthetic" adopted by national policy makers in the 1990s.

Results

Results by province

References

1987
1987 elections in Argentina
Presidency of Raúl Alfonsín